Rosita Runegrund (born 1947) is a Swedish Christian Democratic politician. She has been a member of the Riksdag since 1998. Rosita also sits on the Executive Committee of AWEPA.

References

External links
Rosita Runegrund at the Riksdag website

1947 births
21st-century Swedish women politicians
Living people
Members of the Riksdag 1998–2002
Members of the Riksdag 2002–2006
Members of the Riksdag 2006–2010
Members of the Riksdag from the Christian Democrats (Sweden)
Women members of the Riksdag